The Ruston Central Fire Station is a historic fire station located at 200 East Mississippi Avenue in Ruston, Louisiana.

Originally built in 1926, the two-story stucco over concrete structure was expanded in 1945 with the addition of a one-story side wing which did not alter its overall style and look.

The building was listed on the National Register of Historic Places on October 8, 1992.

See also
 National Register of Historic Places listings in Lincoln Parish, Louisiana

References

Fire stations on the National Register of Historic Places in Louisiana
Fire stations completed in 1926
National Register of Historic Places in Lincoln Parish, Louisiana
1926 establishments in Louisiana
Ruston, Louisiana